Flora Cross (born January 11, 1993) is a French-American actress.

Personal life 
Cross was born in Paris, France. Her father, Joseph Cross, is a journalist. Flora is Jewish. She has traveled extensively with her family, most recently back to France to finish her degree. She graduated from La Sorbonne where she received her BA in Sociology. She currently resides in Jacmel, Haiti where she is a teacher. Her two brothers are also actors (Eli Marienthal and Harley Cross). Cross attended French schools since childhood (Lycée français de New York), and speaks French, Spanish and English fluently.  During high school, she switched to the American school system and attended a private school in Los Angeles' Westside. She graduated from New Roads School in 2012. She graduated from La Sorbonne in 2016 and then moved to Haiti. She has two kids now. She is a Montessori teacher as well, as a soap maker. She has a small business called Yaquimel Savon.

Acting career 
Cross played the lead role of Eliza in the 2005 film Bee Season, opposite Richard Gere, Juliette Binoche and Max Minghella.  She auditioned for the part shortly before moving to Argentina, where she was living when offered the role. "My manager sent the tape in, and then I was called in for an audition that was very long and very tiring," recalls the actor. "It went on for five hours. Two weeks later I was told I got the part".

Her next role was playing the eccentric daughter of Jennifer Jason Leigh's character in director Noah Baumbach's Margot at the Wedding. She worked alongside actors such as Nicole Kidman, Jack Black, & John Turturro.

Cross co-starred in Chlorine, written and directed by Jay Alaimo. The film also stars Kyra Sedgwick and Vincent D'Onofrio as Cynthia's troubled parents, and Ryan Donowho as her eccentric brother.

Filmography

Awards

References

External links

Margot at the Wedding (2007)

1993 births
Living people
21st-century American actresses
Actresses from Los Angeles
Actresses from Paris
American child actresses
American film actresses
American people of French-Jewish descent
French emigrants to the United States
21st-century French Jews
Jewish American actresses
Lycée Français de New York alumni
21st-century American Jews